The Pigeon Mountain salamander (Plethodon petraeus) is a species of salamander in the family Plethodontidae.
It is endemic to Pigeon Mountain in the US state of Georgia.

Its natural habitats are temperate forests, rocky areas, and caves. It is threatened by habitat loss.

References

Amphibians of the United States
Plethodon
Amphibians described in 1988
Taxonomy articles created by Polbot